William Roderick "Roddy" Evans (19 December 1934 – 6 November 2016) was a Welsh international rugby union lock who played club rugby for Cardiff and Bridgend. He was awarded thirteen caps for Wales and toured on the 1959 British Lions tour to Australia and New Zealand. He died in November 2016 at the age of 81.

International matches played
Wales
  1958
  1958, 1961, 1962
  1958, 1961
  1958, 1961, 1962
  1958, 1961, 1962
  1960

Bibliography

References

1934 births
2016 deaths
Barbarian F.C. players
Bridgend RFC players
British & Irish Lions rugby union players from Wales
Cardiff RFC players
Rugby union players from Blackwood, Caerphilly
Rugby union locks
Wales international rugby union players
Welsh rugby union players